Mariano Garchitorena y Chereau (February 12, 1898 – October 1, 1961) was a Filipino politician of Spanish-French descent.

Garchitorena was the son of Don Andres Garchitorena and a French lady, Margarite Chereau. He was married to Dona Caridad Pamintuan. He was the cousin of guerrilla Major Don Tomas T. Garchitorena and the brother of the actor Salvador A. Garchitorena, grandfather of Anjo Yllana, Jomari Yllana, and Jaime Garchitorena. He was also the uncle of Justice Francis Garchitorena, actor Andres Centenera and TV and radio star in the 1960s, Andres Garchitorena, brother of Stellita of Hanawan, Camarines Sur.

He was briefly Governor of Camarines Sur in 1919 and again in 1945. He was elected President of the Abacá Fiber Institute of the Philippines then appointed by President Manuel Roxas as Secretary of Agriculture and Commerce, later run for senator one slots below of being elected, became ambassador to Spain. Retired and remained the Liberal Party Chairman in Bicolandia.

References

1898 births
1961 deaths
Ambassadors of the Philippines to Spain
Secretaries of Agriculture of the Philippines
Secretaries of Environment and Natural Resources of the Philippines
Governors of Camarines Sur
People from Camarines Sur
Hong Kong people
Liberal Party (Philippines) politicians
Filipino people of French descent
Filipino people of Spanish descent
Roxas administration cabinet members
Quirino administration cabinet members